Mamoun Elyounoussi (born June 23, 1987) is a Dutch actor of Moroccan descent. His early roles include Polleke and Winky's Horse.

Early life, family and education

Elyounoussi was born in Amsterdam.

Career
Mamoun Elyounoussi began performing as a child actor.

He was nominated for the Golden Calf Award for Best Supporting Actor in 2005 for his performance in Het Paard van Sinterklaas. His first adult role was in Coach (2009).

Roles
 Polleke (2003) as Mimoun (film)
 Het paard van Sinterklaas (2005; Winky's Horse) as Samir (film)
 Waar is het paard van Sinterklaas? (2007; Where Is Winky's Horse?) as Samir (film)
 Roes (2008; Flush) as Omar (television series; 1 episode)
 We gaan nog niet naar huis (2008; We're not going home yet) as Ab (television series; 4 episodes)
 Coach (2009) as Soukri (film)
 Mocro Maffia (2018) as Gladde

References

External links

Article on Coach and some footage from the film featuring Elyounoussi 

Dutch male actors
Dutch male child actors
Dutch people of Moroccan descent
1987 births
Living people